The Melbourne Ice is an Australian amateur ice hockey team from Melbourne, Victoria. Founded in 2005, the Ice have been a member of the Australian Women's Ice Hockey League (AWIHL) since inception in 2007. The Ice are based at the O'Brien Icehouse, located in the Docklands precinct of Melbourne. The team has won seven Joan McKowen trophies and are five time league premiers.

History

Founded in 2005, the Melbourne Dragons were one of four founding teams of the Australian Women's Ice Hockey League (AWIHL). The Dragons participated in the Showcase Series in 2005/06 and 2006/07 before the formal AWIHL started in 2007/08. The Dragons joined the new league along with the Adelaide Assassins, Brisbane Goannas and Sydney Sirens.

In 2010, the Dragons entered into a memorandum of understanding (MoU) with the Melbourne Ice Hockey Club, who operate the Australian Ice Hockey League men's team. The agreement saw the Ice buy into the club as a minority partner, with the Dragons retaining majority share. The Dragons re-branded to the Melbourne Ice Women and started trading under the name Melbourne Ice. The team also moved into the Olympic sized Henke Rink at the Melbourne Icehouse within the Docklands precinct of Melbourne.

In 2011, the team won its first national championship and trophy. The Ice defeated the Sydney Sirens in the final to clinch the title and their maiden Joan McKowen Trophy. The Melbourne Ice placed second in the league standings at the end of the regular season with eight wins from twelve matches. In the finals, the Ice came up against the Sydney Sirens in a two match series for the Joan McKowen Trophy. In game one, the Ice shutout the Sirens and secured a 1-0 victory. In game two, the Ice maintained the goal difference to win 2-1 in a shootout and claim the national championship and the Joan McKowen Trophy.

The Ice became an AWIHL powerhouse in the 2010s. After their first title in 2011 the team went on to win another six championships and five premierships in the following eight years, including four straight premiership-championship doubles between 2013 and 2016. The last four Joan McKowen Trophy finals the Ice have contested, they have versed rivals Sydney Sirens. They have defeated the Sirens in every final match the two teams have faced each other. In 2019, the two teams met for the grand prize at the Adelaide IceArenA. The match was a tight affair with both teams locked at three-all with one minute left in regulation time. The Ice won the match and the trophy through a Bettina Meyers goal with 36.7 seconds left on the clock.

In 2019 the Melbourne Ice women were ranked 23rd in the Australasia Best Sporting Team (ABST) top twenty-five list. Produced by Platinum Asset Management and GAIN LINE Analytics, the list represents an analytical approach to measuring success in team sports in Australia and New Zealand within a rolling five year period.

Season by season results

Championships

Joan McKowen Trophy 
Champions (7): 2011, 2013, 2014, 2015, 2016, 2018, 2019
 Runners-Up (1): 2012

West Lakes Trophy (repurposed as league premiership trophy in 2010)
Premiers (5): 2013, 2014, 2015, 2016, 2019
 Runners-Up (3): 2011, 2012, 2018

Roster
Current for the 2018–19 AWIHL season

Leaders

Captains

Coaching Staff

Management

Identity

Name and colours

Since 2010, the team have identified with the Melbourne Ice branding including the colours navy blue, crimson red and white. The colours are used in all aspects of the club including: uniforms, supporter merchandise, official media and digital design. Prior to 2010, when the team operated in the AWIHL as the Melbourne Dragons, the team identified with the colours indigo blue and white. The team has changed names once, in 2010 after the signing of the MoU between the Dragons and Ice. Since 2010 the team has identified as the Melbourne Ice.

Facilities

In 2010, after the Dragons re-branded to the Melbourne Ice, they moved into the newly completed $58m Melbourne Icehouse (Known as the O’Brien Icehouse for sponsorship reasons), located in the Docklands precinct of Melbourne. The Ice have played all their home matches from the 2010/11 AWIHL season onwards at the Icehouse. The Icehouse is the only twin ice-sheet facility in Australia. The hockey rink within the facility is named the Henke Rink, in honour of Geoffrey Henke AO. The Icehouse has an Olympic sized ice surface, café, bar, specialist winter sports gym, pro shop, corporate boxes and seating for 1,000 spectators as well as room for additional 500 standing attendance on match days.

Prior to 2010, for five years, the Ice, when they were the Dragons, were based in Oakleigh South, Monash in the wider Melbourne metropolitan area. Their home venue was the 300 capacity Olympic Ice Skating Centre (OISC), noted at the time for being a small rink, with its width two-thirds that of a regulation Olympic-sized rink.

Broadcasting
Online video streaming: Kayo Sports (2019 - Current) 
The Melbourne Ice are a part of the entire AWIHL broadcasting deal with Kayo Sports to show one weekly 'game of the week' match that includes 20 minutes of highlights with commentary and player interviews.

See also

Ice Hockey Australia
Joan McKowen Memorial Trophy
Australian Ice Hockey League
Australian Junior Ice Hockey League
Jim Brown Trophy
Goodall Cup

References

External links
Australian Women's Hockey League official site
Melbourne Ice official Site

Women's ice hockey in Australia
Ice hockey clubs established in 2005
Sporting clubs in Melbourne
2005 establishments in Australia
Ice hockey teams in Australia
Women's sports teams in Australia
Women's ice hockey teams
Australian Women's Ice Hockey League
Sport in the City of Melbourne (LGA)
Women in Melbourne